Lists of Cathedrals in the United Kingdom cover cathedrals, churches that contain the cathedra (Latin for "seat") of a bishop. Cathedrals are usually specific to Christian denominations with an episcopal hierarchy, such as the Catholic, Anglican and Orthodox churches.

By region
 List of cathedrals in England and Wales 
 List of cathedrals in Northern Ireland
 List of cathedrals in Scotland

Former cathedrals

 List of former cathedrals in Great Britain

See also
 List of cathedrals in British Overseas Territories

Lists of cathedrals
Cathedrals